Frederik Holst (14 August 1791 – 4 June 1871) was a Norwegian medical doctor. He is regarded as an important pioneer in medicine in Norway.

Biography
Holst was born at Holmestrand in Vestfold, Norway.  He was the son of merchant Hans Holst (1763–1846) and Inger Christine Backer (1765–1850). 

He completed his examen artium at Oslo Cathedral School in 1810.

He was appointed city physician in Christiania (now Oslo) from 1817. He was Professor of Pharmacology, Toxicology and Hygiene at the University of Christiania (now University of Oslo) from 1824 until 1865. His works had significant influence on the treatment of prisoners and of patients with mental disorders. Together with Michael Skjelderup, he started and published Eyrt, the first Norwegian medical journal (1826). In 1831, he was elected a member of the Royal Swedish Academy of Sciences. He was one of the founders of the Norwegian Medical Society in Oslo (1833).

Personal life
He was made a knight in the Order of St. Olav (1847), Commander of St. Olav's Order (1865) and Commander of the Order of the Polar Star. In  1824, he married Dorothea Christierne Steffens (1805–1866).
Holst was the grandfather of linguist Clara Holst and professor Axel Holst.

References

1791 births
1871 deaths
People from Vestfold
People educated at Oslo Cathedral School
 University of Copenhagen alumni
19th-century Norwegian physicians
Academic staff of the University of Oslo
Members of the Royal Swedish Academy of Sciences
 Recipients of the St. Olav's Medal
Commanders of the Order of the Polar Star